Briley Moore-McKinney (born January 13, 1998) is an American football tight end for the DC Defenders of the XFL. He played college football at Kansas State and Northern Iowa.

Early life and high school
Moore grew up in Blue Springs, Missouri and attended Blue Springs South High School, where he played football and basketball. He struggled with injuries in both sports in each of his first three years of high school. As a senior moore was named first-team All-State after catching 37 passes for 653 yards and 15 touchdowns as Blue Springs South won a state championship.

College career
Moore moved from the wide receiver position to tight end during his freshman season and had four receptions for 60 yards and one touchdown. He was named honorable mention All-Missouri Valley Football Conference (MVFC) after catching 38 passes for 494 yards in his sophomore season. As a junior, Moore led the Panthers with 39 receptions, 536 yards and four touchdowns and was named first-team All-MVFC. He suffered a season-ending shoulder injury in the first game of his senior season against Iowa State. After the season Moore announced we would be entering the transfer portal.

Moore transferred to Kansas State as a graduate transfer after considering offers from Baylor and Missouri. In his lone season with the Wildcats he was named second-team All-Big 12 Conference after catching 22 passes for 338 yards and three touchdowns.

Professional career

Tennessee Titans 
Moore signed with the Tennessee Titans as an undrafted free agent shortly after the conclusion of the 2021 NFL Draft. He suffered a torn anterior cruciate ligament (ACL) in practice during training camp and was placed on season-ending injured reserve on August 1, 2021. He was waived on August 17, 2022.

DC Defenders 
On November 17, 2022, Moore was drafted by the DC Defenders of the XFL.

References

External links
Northern Iowa Panthers bio
Kansas State Wildcats bio

Living people
Players of American football from Missouri
American football tight ends
Northern Iowa Panthers football players
Kansas State Wildcats football players
Tennessee Titans players
DC Defenders players
1998 births